Adam Brooks may refer to:

 Adam Brooks (politician) (born 1975), Australian politician
 Adam Brooks (filmmaker) (born 1956), Canadian film director, screenwriter and actor
 Adam Brooks (ice hockey) (born 1996), 4th round selection in 2016 by the Toronto Maple Leafs
 Adam Brooks (wrestler) (born 1991), Australian professional wrestler

See also
 Adam Brook, American surgeon
 Adam Brook (rugby), see 2015 Bradford Bulls season
 Brooks (surname)
 Brooke Adams (disambiguation)